Balasuriya or Balasooriya is a Sinhalese surname.

Notable people
 Jagath Balasuriya (born 1940), Sri Lankan politician
 Kumari Balasuriya, Sri Lankan politician
 Mahinda Balasuriya (born 1953), Sri Lankan police officer
 Sumith Balasuriya, Sri Lankan army officer
 Tharaka Balasuriya, Sri Lankan politician
 Tissa Balasuriya (1924–2013), Sri Lankan priest and theologian

See also
 
 

Sinhalese surnames